

The Lachin corridor (or) is a mountain road that links Armenia and the enclave of Nagorno-Karabakh. Being the only road between these two territories, it is has been often described as a "lifeline" for the residents of Nagorno-Karabakh. The corridor is de jure in the Lachin District of Azerbaijan, but is under the control of a Russian peacekeeping force as provided for in the 2020 Nagorno-Karabakh armistice agreement. The territory of the corridor included the villages of Zabukh, Sus and the city of Lachin itself until 2022. On 26 August 2022, these settlements were transferred to Azerbaijani control. Four days later, a new route to the south was opened for use that bypasses the settlements of Zabukh, Sus and Lachin and instead passes by the villages of Mets Shen/Boyuk Galadarasi and Hin Shen/Kirov.

History 
During the First Nagorno-Karabakh War, the Lachin corridor was blockaded by Azerbaijani forces for four years (August 1988 to May 1992). In June 1992, the corridor came under the control of the Artsakh Defence Army. For administrative purposes, it was part of the Republic of Artsakh's Kashatagh Province. In a statement to the United Nations on 18 September 2005, the Foreign Minister of Azerbaijan, Elmar Mammadyarov, said "It is the issue of communication of the Armenians living in the Nagorno-Karabakh region of Azerbaijan with Armenia and that of the Azerbaijanis living in the Nakhchivan region of Azerbaijan with the rest of the country. We suggest the using of the so-called Lachin corridor – which should be called "Road of Peace" – by both sides in both directions provided that security of this road will be ensured by the multinational peacekeeping forces at the initial stage".

In the aftermath of the Second Nagorno-Karabakh War, which ended with a Russian-brokered armistice, the Lachin corridor became the sole connection between Armenia and Nagorno-Karabakh. The armistice agreement provided:
 Following the ceasefire, around 200 Armenians remained in the Lachin corridor, with 30 of them in Sus, 100 to 120 in Lachin, and over 40 in Zabukh (Aghavno). According to the president of Azerbaijan Ilham Aliyev, a new corridor will be built in the region, as the Lachin corridor passes through the city of Lachin. When this new corridor is completed, the city will revert to Azerbaijani administration.

On August 26, control of the Lachin District was transferred to Azerbaijan. Artsakh authorities gave the residents of the villages along the corridor 20 days notice to evacuate. While Aliyev promised that long-term Armenian Lachin residents would be treated as citizens, he branded the remaining residents as illegal settlers and demanded that they be removed As part of the ceasefire agreement, a new corridor will be built which will also be controlled by Russian peacekeeping forces. Several analysts consider it unlikely that Azerbaijan will allow electricity, gas, and Internet infrastructure to be built along the new highway. 

In March 2021, a journalist for BBC visited the road, reporting that "since the war, Armenians have had no control over who and what uses this road", adding that control is now up to the Russians. Being the only road that connects Nagorno-Karabakh to the Republic of Armenia, it has often been described as a "lifeline" to and for residents of Nagorno-Karabakh.

Current situation 

In August 2022, Azerbaijan built its part of the road around Lachin, while Armenia had not. On 2 August, the local Armenian authorities reported that the Azerbaijani side had conveyed to them a demand to organize communication with Armenia along a different route, bypassing the existing one. Following the renewed clashes around Lachin, Secretary of the Security Council of Armenia Armen Grigoryan stated that Azerbaijan's demand for the Lachin corridor was unlawful, since the Armenian side has not yet agreed to any plan for the construction of a new road. Azerbaijan accused Armenia of delaying the construction of its part of the road, while the part for which Azerbaijan was responsible had already been built. On 4 August, the Minister of Territorial Administration and Infrastructure of Armenia, Gnel Sanosyan, stated that the construction of an alternative road to Lachin was actively underway and would be completed the spring of 2023. On 5 August, local Armenian authorities told the residents of Lachin, as well as Zabukh and Sus, to leave their homes by 25 August, after which the towns would be handed over to Azerbaijan. Some of the Armenian inhabitants burned their houses down. As of 26 August, Azerbaijan regained control of villages in the Lachin corridor, including Lachin, Sus, and Zabukh. Soon after, the alternate route to the south that passes by the villages of Mets Shen/Boyuk Galadarasi and Hin Shen/Kichik Galadarasi (formerly Kirov) opened for use .

From 12 December 2022, citizens of Azerbaijan claiming to be "eco-activists" launched a blockade of the Lachin corridor, leaving 1,100 people, including 270 children, unable to return to their homes. This was followed by Azerbaijan cutting off the gas supply from Armenia to Nagorno-Karabakh (between 13 and 16 December), putting the 120,000 Armenian residents of Nagorno-Karabakh at risk of humanitarian crisis. The blockade was condemned by the UN Secretary General, France, Greece, the Netherlands, Russia, Canada, and a number of other countries. The issue is also on the agenda of the Parliamentary Assembly of the Council of Europe.

See also
 Lachin offensive

References

External links

 Armenians and Azerbaijanis Commemorate Two Years Since Breakout of April War

Landforms of Azerbaijan
Kashatagh (province)
Geopolitical corridors
Mountain passes of Europe
Mountain passes of Asia
Nagorno-Karabakh
Republic of Artsakh
Armenia–Azerbaijan border